Nawidemak was a Kandake of Kush who ruled either early in the 1st century BC or 1st century AD. She is known from the wall relief of her burial chamber, as well as a gold plaque. She may also have been one of the Kandakes referred to in the New Testament of the Bible.

Biography
Nawidemak as a ruler of the Kingdom of Kush, either from the 1st century BC, or 1st century AD. She is known from the wall relief of her burial chamber at Meroe (Beg. N 6), which shows her wearing the royal coat, sash and tasselled cord; these elements are more commonly shown with male rulers of Kush. Both the fastening knot on her coat, and on the cord feature a couchant animal, which is another symbol of royalty. This symbol makes its latest appearance in Nawidemak's relief, having been used in Kushite designs since the 3rd century BC. In the relief, she wears the crown of Osiris on her head.

On the northern wall of the chamber, Nawidemak is shown with a long skirt and with bare breasts, which is symbolic of her fertility and as the mother of another ruler. A gold tablet referring to Nawidemak is included in the collection of the Allen Memorial Art Museum in Oberlin, Ohio.

Nawidemak is the fourth in succession of female rulers of Kush, known as the Kandakes. These rulers are each referred to in the New Testament of the Bible, without differentiation between them. Based on the idea that she ruled during the 1st Century AD, Nawidemak is thought to be the Kandake referred to in the eighth chapter of the Acts of the Apostles, whose treasurer was converted to Christianity by Philip the Evangelist.

References

1st-century BC monarchs of Kush
1st-century BC women rulers
1st-century monarchs of Kush
1st-century women rulers
Ancient queens regnant
Queens of Kush
People in Acts of the Apostles